St Patrick's Young Men Football Club is a Northern Irish, junior football club based in Belfast, playing in Division 2A of the Northern Amateur Football League. The club, founded in 1965 as Peter Pan, and originally based in west Belfast, has been a member of the Amateur League since 2009. Club colours are yellow and blue.

The club participates in the Irish Cup.

External links
 nifootball.co.uk - (For fixtures, results and tables of all Northern Ireland amateur football leagues)

References

 

Association football clubs in Northern Ireland
Association football clubs in County Antrim
Association football clubs in Belfast
Northern Amateur Football League clubs